The Muhdi, is a Somali sub-clan. It forms a part of the Dishiishe Harti confederation of Darod clans, and primarily inhabit Somalia, Oman and Yemen. The Muhdis are believed to the largest sub-clan within Dishiishe both in terms of population size and land inhabitation but they are largely dispersed people living three respective countries

References

Somali clans